The 1964 Kansas gubernatorial election was held on November 3, 1964. Republican nominee William H. Avery defeated Democratic nominee Harry G. Wiles with 50.9% of the vote.

This marks the last time in Kansas history that the elected Governor was of the same party as the outgoing Governor.

Primary elections
Primary elections were held on August 4, 1964.

Democratic primary

Candidates 
Harry G. Wiles, Kansas Corporation Commissioner
Jules V. Doty
George Hart, former Kansas State Treasurer
Joseph W. Henkle Sr., former Lieutenant Governor
J. Donald Coffin
Ewell Stewart

Results

Republican primary

Candidates
William H. Avery, U.S. Representative
McDill "Huck" Boyd, Newspaper publisher
Paul R. Wunsch, President of the Kansas Senate
William M. Ferguson, Kansas Attorney General
Harold H. Chase, incumbent Lieutenant Governor
Albert S. Myers 	
Dell Crozier

Results

General election

Candidates
Major party candidates
William H. Avery, Republican
Harry G. Wiles, Democratic 

Other candidates
Kenneth L. Myers, Independent
Harry E. Livermore, Prohibition

Results

References

1964
Kansas
Gubernatorial